Lorne Nadeau (1926-1998) was a Canadian ice hockey player and coach known for his league championship teams in the Pacific Southwest Hockey League.

Lorne started his professional career as a hockey player with the Spokane Flyers team in 1948 and also played for the Spokane Spokes and Seattle Bombers of the Western Hockey League and also Quebec Aces before achieving his longest success as a player and later a coach of the Fresno Falcons of the Pacific Southwest Hockey League.

Nadeau arrived in Fresno in 1968 and served as a player-coach through the 1975-76 season, before retiring as a player and devoting his time fully to coaching.  He led the Falcons to several championships before retiring from coaching following the 1982-83 season.

Nadeau died in 1998.

References

1926 births
1998 deaths
Canadian ice hockey coaches
Franco-Manitoban people
Fresno Falcons players
Ice hockey people from Winnipeg
Seattle Bombers players
Western International Hockey League players